Maurice Marie Charles Joseph De Wulf (April 6, 1867–December 23, 1947), was a Belgian Thomist philosopher, professor of philosophy at the Catholic University of Leuven, was one of the pioneers of the historiography of medieval philosophy. His book History of Medieval Philosophy appeared first in 1900 and was followed by many other editions and translations, one them being available today online.

Life and work
Maurice De Wulf was born at Poperinghe, Belgium on 6 April 1867. He studied at the Catholic University of Leuven, where he became a Doctor of Thomistic Theology. He taught the history of medieval philosophy, logic, and criteriology. He was named an honorary president of the 1911 International Congress of Philosophy.

During the 1920s he taught at Harvard and his  Philosophy and Civilization in the Middle Ages was published at Princeton in 1922. He was a Knight of the Order of Leopold, and a member of the Imperial and Royal Academy of Brussels, and the Administrative Council of the Royal Library of Belgium. De Wulf contributed articles relative to philosophy to the Catholic Encyclopedia.

Very early it was noted that "In his Histoire de la Philosophie Médievale, Mr. de Wulf departs from the common view which identifies Scholasticism with Mediaeval philosophy, and discovers in the Middle Ages two antithetical currents: Scholasticism proper, represented by Thomas Aquinas, Duns Scotus, Albert the Great, etc.; and anti-Scholasticism, of which Scotus Erigena is the father, and which is continued by the Catharists, the Albigenses and the Pantheistic schools. Mr. de Wulf's view on this point has not met with a ready acceptance. It has been rejected, among others, by Elie Blanc and Picavet. Mr. de Wulf, however, still holds the same opinion, and has defended it again in his Introduction à  la Philosophie Neo scolastique."

Maurice De Wulf was a close friend of Cardinal Mercier. The "De Wulf-Mansion Centre for Ancient and Medieval Philosophy" was founded (1956) at the Institute of Philosophy in Leuven.

De Wulf retired to Poperinghe in late 1947, and died there on 23 December.

Bibliography
 1892 - La Valeur Esthétique de la moralité dans l'Art
 1895 - Histoire de la Philosophie Scolastique dans les Pays-Bas et la Principauté de Liège, jusqu'à la Révolution française
 1896 - Études Historiques sur l'Esthétique de Saint Thomas d'Aquin
 1900 - Histoire de la Philosophie Médiévale; translated as History of Medieval Philosophy 1901 - Le Traité De Unitate Formae de Gilles de Lessines (texte et étude)
 1904 - Un Théologien-Philosophe du XIIIe. Étude sur la Vie, les œuvres et l'Influence de Godefroid de Fontaines 1910 - Histoire de la Philosophie en Belgique 1915 - Guerre et Philosophie 1920 - L'Œuvre d'Art et la Beauté 1922 - Philosophy and Civilization in the Middle Ages 1932 - Initiation à la Philosophie ThomisteWorks in English translation
 Scholasticism Old and New,  M. H. Gill & Son, Ltd., 1907.
 An Introduction to Scholastic Philosophy, Medieval and Modern, Dover Publications, Inc., 1956.
 An Introduction to Scholastic Philosophy, Medieval and Modern, Editiones Scholasticae, 2012.
 Mediaeval Philosophy: Illustrated from the System of Thomas Aquinas, Harvard University Press, 1922.
 The System of Thomas Aquinas, Dover Publications, Inc., 1959.
 The System of Thomas Aquinas, Editiones Scholasticae, 2013.
 Philosophy and Civilization in the Middle Ages, Princeton University Press, 1922.
 Philosophy and Civilization in the Middle Ages, Editiones Scholasticae, 2013.
 History of Mediaeval Philosophy, Longmans, Green & Co., 1909.
 History of Mediaeval Philosophy, Dover Publications, Inc., 1952.
 Art and Beauty, Herder, 1950.

Articles
 "Western Philosophy and Theology in the Thirteenth Century," The Harvard Theological Review, Vol. XI, 1918.
 "The Teaching of Philosophy and the Classification of the Sciences in the Thirteenth Century," The Philosophical Review, Vol. 27, No. 4, Jul., 1918.
 "The Society of Nations in the Thirteenth Century," International Journal of Ethics, Vol. XXIX, 1919.
 "The Autonomy of Mediaeval Philosophy," The Harvard Theological Review, Vol. 16, No. 2, Apr., 1923.
 "Mystic Life and Mystic Speculation in the Heart of the Middle Ages," The Catholic Historical Review, Vol. 9, No. 2, Jul., 1923.

Other
 "Scholasticism." In Encyclopaedia of the Social Sciences, Vol. XIII, The Macmillan Company, 1934.

See also
 Neothomism
 Scholasticism

References

External links

 Centre De Wulf-Mansion
 History of Medieval Philosophy'' (Jacques Maritain Center, University of Notre Dame)
 

1867 births
1947 deaths
Harvard University faculty
Catholic philosophers
Thomists
Academic staff of the Catholic University of Leuven (1834–1968)
Contributors to the Catholic Encyclopedia